Koillismaa ("North-East Finland") is a subdivision of Northern Ostrobothnia and one of the Sub-regions of Finland since 2009.

Municipalities
 Kuusamo
 Taivalkoski

Geographic region 
Koillismaa is also a geographic region, which includes Kuusamo, Taivalkoski, Posio and Pudasjärvi, sometimes also Ranua and Ylikiiminki (which was merged into Oulu in 2009). The name was first used by Reino Rinne, the founder of the newspaper Koillissanomat in 1950, however the name was popularized by Kalle Päätalo in the 1960s.

Dialects 
The dialects of Kuusamo, Taivalkoski and Posio are Savonian dialects, specifically Kainuu dialects. Parts of Pudasjärvi also use a Kainuu dialect.

Politics
Results of the 2018 Finnish presidential election:

 Sauli Niinistö   56.3%
 Matti Vanhanen   15.7%
 Paavo Väyrynen   11.7%
 Laura Huhtasaari   5.9%
 Pekka Haavisto   5.1%
 Merja Kyllönen   2.9%
 Tuula Haatainen   2.2%
 Nils Torvalds   0.2%

References

Sub-regions of Finland
Geography of North Ostrobothnia